The Merkle–Hellman knapsack cryptosystem was one of the earliest public key cryptosystems. It was published by Ralph Merkle and Martin Hellman in 1978. A polynomial time attack was published by Adi Shamir in 1984. As a result, the cryptosystem is now considered insecure.

History
The concept of public key cryptography was introduced by Whitfield Diffie and Martin Hellman in 1976. At that time they proposed the general concept of a "trap-door one-way function", a function whose inverse is computationally infeasible to calculate without some secret "trap-door information"; but they had not yet found a practical example of such a function. Several specific public-key cryptosystems were then proposed by other researchers over the next few years, such as RSA in 1977 and Merkle-Hellman in 1978.

Description
Merkle–Hellman is a public key cryptosystem, meaning that two keys are used, a public key for encryption and a private key for decryption. It is based on the subset sum problem (a special case of the knapsack problem). In general, this problem is known to be NP-complete. However, if  is superincreasing, meaning that each element of the set is greater than the sum of all the numbers in the set lesser than it, the problem is "easy" and solvable in polynomial time with a simple greedy algorithm.

In Merkle–Hellman, decrypting a message requires solving an apparently "hard" knapsack problem. The private key also contains some "trapdoor" information that can be used to transform a hard knapsack problem using  into an easy knapsack problem using .

Unlike some other public key cryptosystems such as RSA, the two keys in Merkle-Hellman are not interchangeable; the private key cannot be used for encryption. Thus Merkle-Hellman is not directly usable for authentication by cryptographic signing, although Shamir published a variant that can be used for signing.

Key generation
1. Choose a block size . Integers up to  bits in length can be encrypted with this key.

2. Choose a random superincreasing sequence of  positive integers

3. Choose a random integer  such that
 

4.

5. Calculate the sequence

where .

Encryption
Let  be an -bit message consisting of bits , with  the highest order bit. Equivalently, calculate
.

Decryption
That problem can be solved in polynomial time since  is superincreasing.

1. Calculate the modular inverse of  modulo  using the Extended Euclidean algorithm.

2. Calculate

3. Solve the subset sum problem for  using the superincreasing sequence , by the simple greedy algorithm described below. (That is, .)

4. Construct the message  with a 1 in each  bit position and a 0 in all other bit positions:

Solving the subset sum problem

1. Initialize  to an empty list.

2.

3. Subtract: .

4. Append  to the list .

5. If  is greater than zero, return to step 2.

Example

Key generation
Create a key to encrypt 8-bit numbers by creating a random superincreasing sequence of 8 values:

The sum of these is 706, so select a larger value for :
.
Choose  to be coprime to : 
.

Hence .

Encryption
Let the 8-bit message be .
   0 * 295
 + 1 * 592
 + 1 * 301
 + 0 * 14
 + 0 * 28
 + 0 * 353
 + 0 * 120
 + 1 * 236
     = 1129
The ciphertext  is 1129.

Decryption
To decrypt 1129, first use the Extended Euclidean Algorithm to find the modular inverse of  mod :
. 

Compute . 

Use the greedy algorithm to decompose 372 into a sum of  values:

The message can now be computed as
.

Cryptanalysis

In 1984 Adi Shamir published an attack on the Merkle-Hellman cryptosystem which can decrypt encrypted messages in polynomial time without using the private key. The attack analyzes the public key  and searches for a pair of numbers  and  such that  is a superincreasing sequence. The attack operates solely on the public key; no access to encrypted messages is necessary.

References

Public-key encryption schemes
Broken cryptography algorithms